Rabbit Songs is the debut album by Hem.  It was released on June 11, 2002, on DreamWorks Records.  The album was featured on NPR's All Songs Considered following its release, and the song "Half Acre" was later used in a Liberty Mutual commercial.

Track listing
All songs written by Dan Messé, except when noted.

 "Lord, Blow the Moon Out Please" (Traditional) - 0:26  
 "When I Was Drinking" - 3:44 
 "Half Acre" - 3:23 
 "Burying Song" - 1:13 
 "Betting On Trains" - 2:44
 "Leave Me Here" - 3:50
 "All That I'm Good For" - 3:24  
 "Idle (The Rabbit Song)" - 3:44  
 "Stupid Mouth Shut" - 3:24 
 "Lazy Eye" (Messé/Gary Maurer) - 2:26 
 "Sailor" - 3:00   
 "Polly's Dress" - 1:12   
 "Night Like a River" (Steve Curtis) - 3:47 
 "The Cuckoo" (Traditional) - 2:57 
 "Waltz" - 2:41 
 "Horsey" (Messé/Maurer) - 3:34

Personnel 
Sally Ellyson - vocals 
Dan Messé - piano, accordion, glockenspiel 
Gary Maurer - guitar, mandolin 
Steve Curtis - guitar, mandolin, banjo, back-up vocals 
Catherine Popper - double bass, back-up vocals
Mark Brotter - drums 
Bob Hoffnar - pedal steel guitar
Heather Zimmerman - violin

References

2002 debut albums
Hem (band) albums
DreamWorks Records albums